Viorel Dinu (born 17 March 1980) is a Romanian former footballer who played as a striker and current coach.

Honours
FC Snagov
 Liga III: 2007–08

External links
 
 

1980 births
Living people
Footballers from Bucharest
Romanian footballers
Association football forwards
Liga I players
Liga II players
ASC Daco-Getica București players
FC Progresul București players
FCM Câmpina players
FC Politehnica Iași (1945) players
FC Brașov (1936) players
CS Concordia Chiajna players
FC Universitatea Cluj players
AFC Săgeata Năvodari players
AS Voința Snagov players
Romanian football managers